The Indianapolis mayoral election of 1991 took place on November 5, 1991 and saw the election of Republican Stephen Goldsmith.

Nominations
Primaries were held in May.

Democratic primary
State senator Louis Mahern won the Democratic primary.

Republican primary
Following his failed 1990 run for Secretary of State, incumbent Republican mayor William Hudnut III announced in December 1990 that he would not seek reelection in the following year's election.

Marion County prosecutor Stephen Goldsmith defeated state senator Virginia Blankenbaker for the Republican nomination. Before the primary, Goldsmith had secured the endorsement of the county Republican caucus. Blankenbaker unsuccessfully sought to win by attracting crossover votes by Democrats.

General election
On education, Goldsmith was a supporter of school choice, increased parental involvement in education, and an opponent of court ordered desegregation busing. Mahern similarly supported school choice and argued for the need to reestablish neighborhood schools.

Both candidates supported completing the construction of the Circle Centre mall. Goldsmith, however, promised not to spend any more public funds on it.

On crime, both candidates supported community policing. Mahern supported implementing a waiting period for the purchase of guns.

Both candidates argued that the city needed to undertake infrastructure improvements. Both candidates opposed raising property taxes to fund such improvements. Mahern was supportive of an increase in the city's sewer tax, and sought to create a commuter tax.
 Goldsmith was open to increasing user fees to pay for infrastructure expenditures. The two candidates disagreed on the expense of infrastructure demands. Mahern endorsed the Indianapolis Chamber of Commerce's report on infrastructure, while Goldsmith contended that between $100 and 200 million could be cut from the report's $1.1 billion cost estimate. Both candidates proposed selling municipal assets in order to raise funds.

Less than half of the city's 417,000 eligible voters participated in the election.

Mahern lost a significant share of the  traditionally-Democratic Catholic vote, which some experts attributed to his stance on abortion. Mahern received strong support from African American voters. Goldsmith overwhelming won the city's outlying, primarily white, precincts.

References

1991
1991 United States mayoral elections
1991 Indiana elections